The Satellite Award for Best Art Direction and Production Design is one of the annual awards given by the International Press Academy.

Winners and nominees

1990s
Best Art Direction

2000s

Best Art Direction and Production Design

2010s

2020s

Best Production Design

References

External links
 Official website

Awards for best art direction
Art Direction and Production Design